Gaël N'Lundulu (born 29 April 1992) is a French professional footballer who plays a left winger for Championnat National 3 side Paris Saint-Germain B.

Club career

Paris Saint-Germain 
N'Lundulu first began his footballing career in his hometown with Paris Saint-Germain.  By age 16 however, he was ready to move on and sign professional terms with a team away from Paris as PSG were only willing to offer a trainee contract.

Portsmouth 
After much speculation, he signed with Portsmouth in summer 2008 and spent the next two seasons playing primarily for the reserve team, though he did make the bench in a fourth round League Cup match against Stoke City on 27 October 2009. Due to the immense financial difficulties of the English club, N'Lundulu's contract ended in summer 2010.

Lausanne-Sport 
He moved on to Nantes where he went on trial, featuring in several friendlies at the beginning of the season but he was not able to earn himself a contract.  Eventually he joined Swiss-side Lausanne-Sport in February 2011. At the end of the 2011–12 season he was released from the club.

Aris
On 22 August 2014, he signed for Greek club Aris. He did not make any appearances during the first part of the season, but in the second part of the season he was one of Aris's most important players, scoring 5 goals in 11 games. He became a fan favorite due to him scoring wonderful goals. He re-signed with Aris on 5 November. N'Lundulu scored an amazing goal from outside the box in a 3–1 win over Apollon Kalamaria.

Apollon Pontou
On 30 August 2016 he joined Apollon Pontou. He scored 11 goals, helping his team gain promotion to the Football League.

Apollon Paralimnio
On 8 August 2019, N'Lundulu joined Apollon Paralimnio.

Return to Paris Saint-Germain 
In 2020, N'Lundulu joined the amateur reserve side of Paris Saint-Germain.

International career 
N'Lundulu played for the France U19 national team in 2008.

Personal life
His brother Dan, is also a footballer.

References

External links
 
 
 

1992 births
Living people
French sportspeople of Democratic Republic of the Congo descent
Association football forwards
French footballers
France youth international footballers
French expatriate footballers
Paris Saint-Germain F.C. players
Portsmouth F.C. players
FC Lausanne-Sport players
PFC Chernomorets Burgas players
FC Lokomotiv 1929 Sofia players
Aris Thessaloniki F.C. players
Trikala F.C. players
Onisilos Sotira players
Apollon Paralimnio F.C. players
Swiss Challenge League players
Swiss Super League players
First Professional Football League (Bulgaria) players
Football League (Greece) players
Championnat National 3 players
People from Villiers-le-Bel
Footballers from Val-d'Oise
French expatriate sportspeople in Switzerland
French expatriate sportspeople in Bulgaria
French expatriate sportspeople in Greece
French expatriate sportspeople in Cyprus
Expatriate footballers in Switzerland
Expatriate footballers in Bulgaria
Expatriate footballers in Greece
Expatriate footballers in Cyprus
Black French sportspeople